Raúl Zurita Canessa (born 1950) is a Chilean poet. He won the Chilean National Prize for Literature in 2000.

Biography

Raúl Zurita was born in Santiago de Chile in 1950, where he spent his childhood and school years. In 1967 he began his studies of Civil Engineering at the Federico Santa María Technical University in Valparaiso as well as Mathematics at the School of Technical Engineering in Santiago. When on 11 September 1973, Chile's socialist government was overthrown by a military coup, Zurita was arrested and detained with almost one thousand others in the hold of a ship; a traumatic experience for the then 22-year-old. At that time he married Myriam Martínez and had three children. Zurita spent four years earning his living as a computer salesman during a period of financial hardship. At the same time he was a guest reader at the Faculty of Philosophy at the Universidad de Chile in Santiago, where he met writers and intellectuals such as Nicanor Parra, Ronald Kay, Christian Hunneus and Enrique Lihn. The first of his poems to be published appeared in 1975 in "Manuscritos", the Philosophy Faculty's publication. Four years later "Purgatorio" was published, the first part of a poetic trilogy which Zurita would not conclude for another fourteen years. The book became a huge success. Together with friends Raúl Zurita founded the artists action group "Colectivo de Acción de Arte", CADA, in protest against the Pinochet government, but despair in the face of the dictatorship's regime of terror gradually took hold. No longer wanting to witness the pain surrounding him, he attempted to burn his eyes with ammonium acid but fortunately failed. He got married with his second wife and together had his fourth child.

In 1982, the second part of Zurita's poetic trilogy entitled "Anteparaiso" was published. Completion of this book went hand in hand with the project to have 15 verses of the poem written by five aeroplanes in eight-kilometre high letters across the sky over New York. These verses which Zurita had written to draw attention to the minorities of the world could be seen throughout large parts of New York.

In 1984, Raúl Zurita was awarded a scholarship by the John Simon Guggenheim Memorial Foundation for his poetical works.  Afterwards he gave readings and held lectures at several North American universities, including Harvard, Yale, Stanford and Berkeley. In 1989 he was granted the Pablo Neruda Award for his lifetime poetical achievements. 
In 1990, Zurita lectured as visiting professor at the Universidad de Chile and in the same year he was made his country's cultural attaché to Rome by Chile's democratic government under President Patricio Aylwin. At that time he lived with Amparo Mardones for 16 years. During the Expo '92 in Sevilla his works were chosen to represent Chilean poetry. In 1996, he bulldozed the verse, no pain no fear among five kilometres of the Atacama Desert, which can only be seen from the sky. In 2000 he received Chile's national prize for literature.
In 2002 he met and then married his present wife, Dr. Paulina Wendt.

In 1993 an extensive third volume concluded Raúl Zurita's poetic trilogy. "La Vida Nueva" draws on Dante's Divina Commedia in tracing and appraising the Chilean people's twenty-year odyssey of suffering and hope and fits its author into place in line with the literary and political tradition of Gabriel Mistral, Pablo Neruda, Nicanor Parra, and other formidable Chilean poets. "Zurita", a volume of poetry, appeared in 2011. Raúl Zurita, who has suffered from Parkinson's disease since 2002, declared this to be his last publication. However, he has published many more books. In 2014, Copper Canyon Press, with support from The Poetry Foundation, published Pinholes in the Night: Essential Poems from Latin America, an intensely focused bilingual anthology of Latin American poetry, published as a part of "Poet in the World," a book series of poetics from around the world, edited by Ilya Kaminsky. This anthology, selected and compiled by Zurita and edited by Forrest Gander, contains one poem by each of eighteen poets, ranging from Pablo Neruda to Ernesto Cardenal to Cesar Vallejo, and spans the twentieth century. He has been married to Paulina Wendt since 2002, to whom he has dedicated all of his recent works. In 2011, he published Zurita, considered a masterpiece.

His books have been translated into many languages, among others, English, French, German, Swedish, Bengali, Hindi, Chinese, Italian, Russian, Greek and Slovenian.

Currently he is translating the Divina Commedia into Spanish.

Work
Purgatory (1979)
Anteparaíso (1982)
Paradise is empty (1984)
Song of love gone (1985)
The love of Chile (1987)
Song of the rivers they love (1993)
The New Life (1994)
The white day (2000)
About love, suffering, and the new millennium (2000)
Militants Poems (2000)
INRI (2003)
Dead Poems (2006)
Countries Dead (2007)
Cities Water (2008)
In Memoriam (2008)
Five fragments (2008)
Journal of war (2009)
Dreams for Kurosawa (2010)
Zurita (2011)
 Added to The &NOW Awards 2: The Best Innovative Writing (2013) 
Pinholes in the Night: Essential Poems from Latin America (Copper Canyon Press, 2013)

Awards
 1984 Guggenheim Fellow Fudación
 1988 Pablo Neruda Award
 Pericles Gold Award 1994, Italy
 Municipal Poetry Prize 1995, Santiago, Chile, New life
 National Literature Prize, Chile (2000)
 Künstlerprogramm Fellow DAAD, Berlin 2002
 Casa de las Americas Prize for Poetry 2006 José Lezama Lima, Havana, Cuba, by INRI*
Doctor Honoris Causa - Universidad de Alicante, Spain, 2015
Doctor Honoris Causa - Universidad Técnica Federico Santa María, Chile, 2015.
 2015 Pablo Neruda Ibero American Prize
 2017 José Donoso Iberoamerican Prize
 2018 Asan Memorial World Poetry Prize from KERALA, INDIA

References

External links
Raúl Zurita en Memoria Chilena. Además de un esbozo y una cronología del author, aquí se puede descargar gratuita y legalmente, además de artículos, sus libros Purgatorio, Canto a su amor desaparecido y El amor de Chile
A Review of Purgatory, translated by Anna Deeny, by Forrest Gander at Jacket
Raúl Zurita en letras.s5.com
Benoît Santini. El cielo y el desierto como soportes textuales de los actos poéticos de Raúl Zurita
Raúl Zurita en Blue Flower Arts New York
Raúl Zurita en Poetry Foundatión - links to Written on the Sky, an interview conducted by Daniel Borzutzky who talks with Zurita about life after Pinochet.
International Poets in Conversation: Raúl Zurita and Forrest Gander at The Poetry Foundation
- A conversation between Zurita and American poet Forrest Gander.

1950 births
People with Parkinson's disease
Living people
21st-century Chilean poets
21st-century Chilean male writers
Chilean male poets
Chilean translators
Chilean people of Italian descent
Federico Santa María Technical University alumni
National Prize for Literature (Chile) winners
20th-century Chilean poets
20th-century Chilean male writers